"Heartlight (Polygon)" is a song by British record producer Ts7. It was co-written by Taylor Fowlis, Penny Foster & Paul Aiden and features English recording artist Taylor Fowlis. The song was released in the United Kingdom on 7 February 2013.

Critical reception
The track was well received with many excited by its tech house and garage influences. Critics also noted "Taylor’s voice is perfectly sweet, barely-processed so that it evokes the emotion". The track was also listed as on the music industry tip page "Record Of The Day".

Music video
The official music video was uploaded to YouTube on 17 February 2013. It was shot in Shoredich, London and introduced young singer/songwriter Taylor Fowlis The video was popular across music television with it reaching number 1 on the MTV Base Charts in the UK.

References

2013 songs
2013 singles
Ts7 songs
All Around the World Productions singles